Antje Susanne Meyer (born 15 December 1957, Hemer, West Germany) is a German-Dutch experimental psychologist, known for her work in language production. She is currently one of the scientific directors of the Max Planck Institute for Psycholinguistics in Nijmegen, the Netherlands, and also a professor of individual differences in language processing at Radboud University.

Meyer was elected member of the Royal Netherlands Academy of Arts and Sciences (KNAW) in 2018. In 2018 she also became a member of the German Academy of Sciences Leopoldina.

Notable publications

References

1957 births
Living people
German psychologists
Dutch psychologists
German women psychologists
Dutch women psychologists
Experimental psychologists
Radboud University Nijmegen alumni
Academic staff of Radboud University Nijmegen
Members of the Royal Netherlands Academy of Arts and Sciences
People from Hemer
Members of the German Academy of Sciences Leopoldina
Max Planck Institute directors